Enteromius dialonensis is a species of ray-finned fish in the genus Enteromius found in the upper Gambia River, upper Niger River and upper Senegal River in West Africa.

Footnotes 

 

Enteromius
Fish described in 1962
Taxa named by Jacques Daget